The Wisconsin Trade Center is a low-rise commercial office building located in Middleton, Wisconsin. Standing at approximately 134 feet tall, it is the tallest building in Middleton.

Amentities
The building is made of mostly blue glass windows. The entry room is a giant atrium/lobby made mostly of glass. It includes many conference centers, classrooms, and offices, some with card access. It also contains a full service cafeteria, where food is offered by a local catering business called Blue Plate Café. There is also a fitness center and heated, underground parking that is able to fit 954 cars. A skywalk going over Greenway Boulevard links to the nearby Greenway Building, and another connecting to the nearby Western Tower.

Tenants
The following list shows the current tenants of the building:
Insperity
Telephone and Data Systems, Inc.
 NSI, a division of West Bend Mutual Insurance Company.

References

Middleton, Wisconsin
Buildings and structures in Dane County, Wisconsin